Two Fathers' Justice is a 1985 American made-for-television drama film about two men from different walks of life who have to work together to bring to justice the killers of their children. It stars Robert Conrad and George Hamilton.

Background
Directed by Rod Holcomb and produced by Bob Long, the film was an NBC movie of the week. For actor Richard Kind, this was his first time in film.

Story
A young couple, a girl and guy are about to marry when they are murdered by some drug dealers. Stack, the father of the girl, is a tough former steel worker who is from the South Side of Chicago. Bradley, the father of the boy, is a successful businessman who has his own private jet. Due to the failure of the system to deal with the killers, who avoid justice, these two men from very different backgrounds have to take matters into their own hands.

Sequel
In the sequel Two Fathers: Justice for the Innocent, a hunt takes place some years later when the murderer of their children escapes from prison. Both fathers reunite to find him.

References

External links
 Imdb: Two Fathers' Justice
 Chicago Tribune: `TWO FATHERS` TAKES AIM AT SOCIAL JUSTICE by Marilynn Preston, TV critic

1985 television films
1985 films
1985 drama films
1980s English-language films
1980s vigilante films
American films about revenge
American vigilante films
American drama television films
Films directed by Rod Holcomb
NBC network original films
1980s American films